Generalized epilepsy with febrile seizures plus (GEFS+) is a syndromic autosomal dominant disorder where affected individuals can exhibit numerous epilepsy phenotypes. GEFS+ can persist beyond early childhood (i.e., 6 years of age). GEFS+ is also now believed to encompass three other epilepsy disorders: severe myoclonic epilepsy of infancy (SMEI), which is also known as Dravet's syndrome, borderline SMEI (SMEB), and intractable  epilepsy of childhood (IEC). There are at least six types of GEFS+, delineated by their causative gene. Known causative gene mutations are in the sodium channel α subunit genes SCN1A, an associated β subunit SCN1B, and in a GABAA receptor γ subunit gene, in GABRG2 and there is another gene related with calcium channel the PCDH19 which is also known as Epilepsy Female with Mental Retardation. Penetrance for this disorder is estimated at 60%.

Signs and symptoms
Individuals with GEFS+ present with a range of epilepsy phenotypes. These include febrile seizures that end by age 6 (FS), such seizures extending beyond age 6 that may include afebrile tonic-clonic, myoclonic, absence, atonic seizures and myoclonic-astatic epilepsy. Individuals may also present with SMEI, characterized by generally tonic-clonic seizures, impaired psychomotor development, myoclonic seizures, ataxia, and poor response to many anticonvulsants.

Pathophysiology

Type 1

GEFS+ type 1 is a subtype of GEFS+ in which there are mutations in SCN1B, a gene encoding a sodium channel β subunit. The β subunit is required for proper channel inactivation. There are two known mutations in SCN1B that lead to GEFS+ (Figure 1). The first and best characterized of these mutations is C121W. This mutation alters a cysteine involved in a disulfide bond in the extracellular N-terminus of the protein. This extracellular region is similar to the cell adhesion molecule contactin and other cell adhesion molecules. It is believed that the disulfide bond disrupted by the C121W mutation is required for the proper folding of this N-terminus motif. Coexpression of SCN1B with sodium channel α subunits in oocytes and other cells results in channels that inactivate more slowly. Expression of C121W mutant along with wild-type α subunits produces current indistinguishable from that through α subunits alone. Further investigation of this mutation has indicated that it results in decreased frequency dependent rundown and, thus, likely hyperexcitability when compared to cells expressing the wild-type subunit. This mutation also disrupts the subunit's ability to induce cellular aggregation. The importance of this last fact is unclear, though it is presumed that proper channel aggregation within cells and cell-cell contact are required for normal neuronal function.

A second mutation has been found in one kindred with GEFS+ type 1. This mutation is in a splice acceptor site of exon 3. The loss of this acceptor site reveals a downstream cryptic acceptor site and a protein missing 5 amino acids in the N-terminus (I70_E74del). This mutation has not been further characterized.

Type 2
A second subtype of GEFS+, type 2, is the result of mutations in SCN1A, a gene encoding a sodium channel α subunit. There are currently almost 90 known mutations in the SCN1A gene throughout the entirety of the channel (see table 1). These mutations result in almost any imaginable mutation type in the gene, short of duplications. The results of these mutations are highly variable, some producing functional channels while others result in non-functional channels. Some functional channels result in membrane hyperexcitability while others result in hypoexcitability. Most of the functional mutant channels result in hyperexcitability due to decreased frequency dependent rundown. An example of this is the D188V mutation. A 10 Hz stimulation of wild-type channels causes current to decrease to approximately 70% of maximum whereas the same stimulation of mutant channels results in rundown to 90% of maximum. This is caused by an expedited recovery from inactivation for mutant channels versus wild-type. The D188V mutant, for example, recovers to 90% maximal current in 200ms while wild-type channels are unable to recover to this degree in >1000ms. Some other functional mutations that lead to hyperexcitability do so by other means, such as decreasing the rate of entrance into the slow inactivated state.

Some of the other functional mutations are believed to result in hypoexcitability. The R859C mutation, for example, has a more depolarized voltage dependence of activation, meaning that the membrane must be more depolarized for the channel to open. This mutant also recovers more slowly from inactivation. The nonfunctional channels are believed to produce similar changes in cell excitability. Likewise, many of the nonsense mutations likely result in nonfunctional channels and hypoexcitability, though this has yet to be tested. It is also unclear how this membrane hypoexcitability leads to the GEFS+ phenotype.

Type 3

Patients with GEFS+ type 3 have mutations in the GABRG2 gene, which encodes the GABAA γ2 subunit (figure 2). The first mutation discovered in GABRG2 was K289M, in the extracellular region linking membrane-spanning domains M2 and M3. Oocytes injected with α1, β2, and γ2 subunits produce large GABA inducible currents whereas those injected with K289M mutant instead of wild-type subunits produce currents much smaller (about 10% of wild-type). This abnormal current is not the result of non-incorporation of mutant subunits since mutant containing receptors are still sensitive to benzodiazepines, a property for which functional γ subunits are required. Because of these results, it is believed that the GEFS+ phenotype in these individuals is a result of hyperexcitability.

Concurrent with the previous mutation, a second group found a second mutation in GABRG2 associated with GEFS+. This mutation, R43Q, is located in the one of two benzodiazepine binding-sites located in the extracellular N-terminus. Benzodiazepines, such as Diazepam, potentiate GABA induced current. This potentiation is abolished in cells expressing the R43Q mutant subunit instead of the wild-type γ subunit. This mutation does not affect the subunit's ability to coassemble into function receptors as it still confers resistance to GABA current blockade by zinc. As with the previous mutation, this mutation is expected to result in neuronal hyperexcitability.

The final known GEFS+ type 3 mutation is a nonsense mutation, Q351X, located in the intracellular  region linking the third and fourth membrane spanning segments. When this mutant subunit is expressed in cells with wild-type α and β subunits it produces non-functional receptors. Since wild-type α and β subunits expressed alone are able to produce GABA inducible current this indicates that the mutation either prevents both coassembly of the mutant and wild-type subunits but also coassembly of the wild-type α and β subunits or prevents proper trafficking of the formed receptor to the membrane. Fusion of GFP onto this mutated subunit has indicated that it is localized to the endoplasmic reticulum instead of the cell membrane. As with other known GEFS+ type 3 mutation, Q351X likely results in neuronal hyperexcitability.

SCN2A mutations

The final type of GEFS+ is caused by mutations in the SCN2A gene, which encodes a sodium channel α subunit. The first associated mutation in this gene is R187W, located on the intracellular region linking membrane spanning units two and three in the first domain (D1S2-S3, figure 3). Patients with this mutation have both febrile and afebrile seizures. Electrophysiological examination of this mutant revealed that it increases the time constant for inactivation, presumably increasing sodium current and leading to hyperexcitability. However, this mutation also yields channels that inactivate at more hyperpolarized potentials relative to wild-type channels, indicative of hypoexcitability. Whether the result on membrane excitability of this mutation is hyperexcitability or hypoexcitability is, as yet, unclear.

The second known mutation in SCN2A associated with GEFS+ is R102X. This mutation is located in the intracellular N-terminus (figure 3) and results in SMEI in patients. The result of this mutation is completely non-functional channels and membrane hypoexcitability. The truncated mutant protein also seems to cause wild-type channels to inactivate at more hyperpolarized potentials, indicating that it also acts in a dominant negative manner.

Management
Long term management is by use of anticonvulsant medication, principally valproate, stiripentol, topiramate or clobazam. Ketogenic diet has also been found useful in certain cases 

Management of breakthrough seizures is by benzodiazepine such as midazolam.

See also
 Febrile seizures
 Idiopathic generalized epilepsy
 Dravet Syndrome Foundation
 International Dravet Epilepsy Action League

References

External links 

Channelopathies
Epilepsy types